Misery Loves Kompany is the sixth studio album by rapper Tech N9ne, and the first release in the "Collabos" series.

Background
The album was recorded in one month and was released on July 17, 2007. It features 17 tracks featuring artists such as Yukmouth, T-Nutty, D-Loc & Dalima, Greed, Money Hungry, Big Scoob (of the 57th Street Rogue Dog ), Joe Vertigo, Shadow, The Philstir and Mr. Reece as well as fellow label mates Krizz Kaliko, Kutt Calhoun, Skatterman & Snug Brim and Prozak. Production was mainly handled by David Sanders II, a producer from Huntsville, Alabama; Sanders handled half the production with the rest mainly being handled by Seven (who produced numerous track for Tech N9ne's 2006 effort Everready: The Religion) with lone production credit going to Rob Rebeck for "You Don't Want It."

Reception
Following its release, the album debuted at number 49 on the U.S. Billboard 200, selling about 13,000 copies in its first week.

Track listing

References

2007 albums
Concept albums
Tech N9ne albums
Albums produced by Seven (record producer)
Strange Music albums